Vivian Mason (July 12, 1918August 24, 2009) was an American actress who appeared in over 30 television shows and films between 1937 and 1955.

Career
Mason is familiar to modern viewers for roles in the Three Stooges films A Missed Fortune and Shot in the Frontier. In addition, she also appeared in the films White Christmas, The Fuller Brush Man, Penthouse Rhythm and  The Beast from 20,000 Fathoms.

Death
Mason died of inanition (a lack of food and water) and dementia on August 24, 2009, in Seattle, Washington. She was a resident of the Ida Culver House-Broadview nursing home at the time of her death, and was cremated.

Filmography

References

External links
 

1918 births
2009 deaths
American television actresses
American film actresses
Actresses from Seattle
20th-century American actresses
21st-century American women